This is a list of prefects of Zadar County.

Prefects of Zadar-Knin County (1993–1997)

Prefects of Zadar County (1997–)

See also
Zadar County

External links
World Statesmen - Zadar County

Zadar County